Uncarved Block is the third studio album by Flux of Pink Indians who, by then, were known simply as Flux. It was released in 1986.

This album started the One Little Indian record label. It was produced by Adrian Sherwood.

The musicians credited on the sleevenotes are Adrian Sherwood, Bob, Bonjo I (African Head Charge), Brian Pugsley, Coal (Colin Latter), Smuff, Kenny, Wellington, Lu, Martin, Paul White, Ray Shulman, Shal, Style Scott (Dub Syndicate), Sue Churchill, Tan and Tim.

Track listing

Side one
"Value of Nothing" - 2:47
"Youthful Immortal" - 5:33
"Just Is" - 1:06
"Children Who Know" - 7:49

Side two
"Backward" - 2:40
"Footprints in the Snow" - 6:16
"Nothing Is Not Done" - 4:32
"Stonecutter" - 5:04

References

1986 albums
Flux of Pink Indians albums
Albums produced by Adrian Sherwood
One Little Independent Records albums